JB Tower was a commercial tower proposed for construction in Downtown Burj Dubai, Dubai. According to planning permission, the tower would rise 240 meters and have 60 floors.

See also

Downtown Dubai
List of tallest buildings in Dubai

References

CTBUH.com
Emporis.com

Proposed skyscrapers in Dubai